Majed Abu Maraheel (born 5 June 1963) is a retired athlete who competed internationally for Palestine.

He represented Palestine at the 1996 Summer Olympics in Atlanta. He competed in the 10,000 metres where he finished 21st, so he did not advance to the final.

References

1963 births
Living people
Palestinian male long-distance runners
Athletes (track and field) at the 1996 Summer Olympics
Olympic athletes of Palestine